Florentina Mallá (14 July 1891 – 7 June 1973) was a Czechoslovak composer and pianist. She studied piano with Josef Jiránek at the Prague Conservatory. After graduating in 1913, she studied composition privately with Vítězslav Novák. She stopped composing during the communist years. Her works include didactic piano compositions, a sonatina and preludium for piano and about fifty songs. She died in Prague.

References

1891 births
1973 deaths
Czechoslovak classical composers
Czechoslovak educators
Women classical composers
Place of birth missing
Women music educators
20th-century women composers